The 1941 Boston College Eagles football team was an American football team that represented Boston College as an independent during the 1941 college football season. In its first year under head coach Denny Myers, the team compiled a 7–3 record and outscored opponents by a total of 235 to 106. The team played its home games at Alumni Field in Chestnut Hill, Massachusetts and Fenway Park in Boston. 

Three Boston College players were selected by the United Press as first-team players on the 1941 All-New England football team: center Naumetz, tackle Morro, and halfback Frank "Monk" Maznicki. Other key players included backs Mike Holovak, Adolph Kissell, Ted Williams, and Lorenzo Castiglione.

Schedule

References

Boston College
Boston College Eagles football seasons
Boston College Eagles football
1940s in Boston